Kenowa Hills Public Schools is a school district headquartered in Alpine Township, Michigan in Greater Grand Rapids. It serves portions of Alpine Township, the City of Walker, and Wright Township (including Marne).

History
Kenowa Hills Public Schools is a district located in the northwest suburban corner of the Grand Rapids area. The district contains a blend of residential areas, businesses, commercial development, and orchards. Kenowa Hills Public Schools was formed when nearly a dozen single-building and rural school districts consolidated in the early 1960s. The district's name was derived from the names of the two counties it services: Kent and Ottawa counties. The high school and district provide education to students in Marne, Walker, Grand Rapids, Alpine Township, and Comstock Park.

Kenowa Hills first opened its doors in 1963 with only one building for a high school and small rooms for the lower grades, at the previously named Berlin High School. Kenowa Hills began growing immediately. In 1992, the Kenowa Hills football team were the Michigan State Championship Runners-Up. By the fall of 1999, Kenowa Hills had built a new high school, which was over double the size of the original high school. The old high school became the middle school for the Kenowa Hills District. Before the 2010–2011 school year, Kenowa Hills closed Marne Elementary and Fairview Elementary, two of the original school districts. Walker Station Elementary was converted to an Early Childhood Center. The Intermediate School, fifth and sixth grade, was turned into an elementary school named Central Elementary.

Locations
Kenowa Hills has six school buildings.
Kenowa Hills Early Childhood Center (City of Walker)
Previously Walker Station Elementary School
Zinser Elementary (City of Walker)
Alpine Elementary (Alpine Township)
Kenowa Hills Central Elementary (City of Walker)
Middle School (Alpine Township)
Kenowa Hills High School (Alpine Township)

Formerly it operated Marne Elementary School located in Marne, Wright Township and Fairview Elementary School in Walker.

References

External links

Official website
Early History of Kenowa Hills

Education in Kent County, Michigan
School districts in Michigan
Education in Grand Rapids, Michigan
School districts established in 1963
1963 establishments in Michigan